Boss is an album by noise rock band Magik Markers, released on September 25, 2007. It was their second release on the Ecstatic Peace label, the first being I Trust My Guitar, Etc., from 2005. A vinyl version was released via Arbitrary Signs.

Track listing
 "Axis Mundi" - 6:23
 "Body Rot" - 2:19
 "Last of the Lemach Line" - 8:59
 "Empty Bottles" - 4:32
 "Taste" - 4:21
 "Four/The Ballad of Harry Angstrom" - 5:22
 "Pat Garrett" - 4:08
 "Bad Dream/Hartford's Beat Suite" - 4:12
 "Circle" - 3:15

References

2007 albums
Magik Markers albums
Ecstatic Peace! albums